Angelina Julietta Francisca Eichhorst is a Dutch diplomat and European civil servant, currently serving as managing director for Europe and Central Asia at the European External Action Service in Brussels, Belgium.

Career

European External Action Service

In September 2010 HRVP Catherine Ashton announced the first class of European Union ambassadors to be posted abroad following the entry into force of the Treaty of Lisbon. Eichhorst served from January 2011 to August 2015 as European Untion ambassador / Head of the European Union delegation to Lebanon.

In July 2015 Eichhorst was appointed by EU HRVP Federica Mogherini as Deputy Managing Director / Director Western Europe, Western Balkans and Turkey at the European External Action Service in Brussels. During this period she was also the EU Chief Negotiator for the EU HRVP Facilitated Belgrade-Pristina Dialogue.

On 1 September 2019, Eichhorst took charge of Thomas Mayr-Harting's portfolio as acting managing director for Europe and Central Asia and on 1 June 2020 EU HRVP Josep Borrell confirmed Eichhorst as managing director.

She served for three Secretary Generals at the European External Action Service: Pierre Vimont, Alain Le Roy and Helga Schmid.

European Commission

Eichhorst joined the European Commission in Brussels in 1996, where at the then DG IB External relations, led by Ambassador DG Juan Prat, she held various positions in charge of the Euro-Mediterranean Barcelona Process - now Union for the Mediterranean. She covered operations in Egypt, Yemen and Jordan.

From 2000 to 2003 she worked for the then DG VIII - now DG DEVCO - led by Ambassador DG Stefano Manservisi and DG Koos Richelle - as national expert seconded from the then ODA led by Clare Short. She worked to initiate EU global policies on human and social development, corporate social responsibility, global public goods, sexual and reproductive health and rights. During part of this period she was the alternative board member for the EU at The Global Fund to Fight AIDS, Tuberculosis and Malaria assisting Dr. Lieve Fransen who was the EU member of the GFATM founding Board and later the co-chair of the Board. Substantial work was done with DG Trade on access to medicines.

In 2004 Eichhorst moved to Amman as Head of Development and Regional Cooperation at the EU Delegation to Jordan also covering EU interventions in Yemen.

In 2008 she was promoted to head the Political and Economic Affairs, Press, Information and Culture department at the EU Delegation in Damascus, Syria where she worked and lived until she took up her position as European Union ambassador in Beirut, Lebanon.

Pre-EU institutions

Before joining the EU institutions, between 1989 and 1996, Eichhorst worked for the United Nations Secretariat in New York in the Office for Research and Collection of Information directly attached to Secretary-General of the United Nations Javier Pérez de Cuéllar, and served as Political Affairs Officer to the Forces Commander of UNOSOM I, the first United Nations Operation in Somalia. She held advisory and management positions in Cairo, Egypt (at the Netherlands Flemish Institute; Shell Marketing Egypt; Save the Children; North South Consultants Exchange).

Ambassador Eichhorst holds two MA degrees: languages and cultures of the Middle East, Catholic University in Nijmegen, with her thesis on Egyptian women writers; and international relations, Université libre de Bruxelles, describing the challenges of NATO's Mediterranean Dialogue. She has special degrees in international law, human rights and the law of international organisations.

References 

1965 births
Living people
Ambassadors of the European Union to Lebanon
Vrije Universiteit Brussel alumni
People from Gulpen-Wittem
Radboud University Nijmegen alumni
Dutch women ambassadors
Dutch officials of the European Union